Yusuf Mutembuli  is a Ugandan advocate of the High Court, academic, politician and member of parliament representing Butaleja District in Bunyole East constituency on the ticket of National Resistance Movement.

In the eleventh parliament, he serves on the Committee on Legal and Parliamentary Affairs.

Political career 
Mutembuli contested in the 2016 election on the platform of Democratic Party (DP) but lost to Nagomu Musamba Moses of NRM. Mutembuli served as Democratic Party Vice President and People Power Coordinator of Eastern Region. He defected to the ruling NRM party in the build up to the 2021 general election after 15 years in DP criticising it as lacking political agenda and said the party is 50 years away from taking presidential power. He was elected to the parliament on the ticket of NRM in the 2021 election.

References  

21st-century Ugandan politicians
Democratic Party (Uganda) politicians
National Resistance Movement politicians
Members of the Parliament of Uganda
Year of birth missing (living people)
Living people